Minnesota State Highway 236 was a short  highway in Traverse County. It connected U.S. Route 75 to a local road in South Dakota that leads to U.S. Route 81. The route was decommissioned in 1985 and is now Traverse County State-Aid Highway 10.

Route description
State Highway 236 served as an east-west route crossing the Bois de Sioux River and, with another road in South Dakota, provided a connector route between U.S. Route 75 and U.S. Route 81. The entire route was located in Monson Township.

History
Highway 236 was authorized in 1949.

It was removed in 1985 and became Traverse County State-Aid Highway 10.

Major intersections

References

236